Jovenel Moïse (26 June 1968 – 7 July 2021) was a Haitian entrepreneur and politician, who served as the 43rd President of Haiti from 2017 until his assassination in 2021. He was sworn in as president in February 2017 after winning the November 2016 election. In 2019, protests and unrest in Haiti became a crisis. In the early morning of 7 July 2021, Moïse was assassinated, and his wife Martine was injured during an attack on their private residence in Pétion-Ville. Claude Joseph took control of the country as acting prime minister following the assassination of Moïse.

Early life and education 

Jovenel Moïse was born on June 26, 1968, in Trou du Nord, Nord-Est, Haiti. His family moved to Port-au-Prince in July 1974, where he continued his primary education at École Nationale Don Durélin. He continued his secondary education at Lycée Toussaint Louverture and then at the Centre Culturel du Collège Canado-Haïtien. He married his classmate Martine Marie Étienne Joseph (Martine Moïse) in 1996. They left the capital that same year and settled in Port-de-Paix to develop rural areas.

The couple have three children together: Jomarlie Moïse, Jovenel Moïse Jr., and Joverlein Moïse. None of the children's ages are known, and very few pictures exist.

Business career 
Moïse started his first business, Jomar Auto Parts. The following year, he began working on an agricultural project involving organic banana production from a plantation covering more than 10 hectares (25 acres) in the Nord-Ouest department. Moïse collaborated with Culligan Water in 2001 to build a drinking water plant for the Nord-Ouest and Nord-Est departments.

In 2012, he founded Agritrans SA, introduced the agricultural project Nourribio to Trou du Nord, and helped create Haiti's first agricultural free trade zone, a 1,000-hectare (2,500-acre) banana plantation in Nord-Est. This project was supposed to export bananas to Germany for the first time since 1954; however, only two containers were ever sent. This nonetheless led him to being nicknamed Nèg Bannann (Banana Man). The government granted tax-free access to the land, 15 years' exemption from income tax and customs duties on the purchase of capital equipment, and a $6 million loan to a new company, Agritrans, owned by Moïse, the president of the local chamber of commerce. Anonymous investors contributed at least another $10 million. Agritrans promised to create about 3,000 jobs; however, as of March 2015, it had employed only 600.

Political career 

In 2015, President Michel Martelly designated Moïse as the presidential candidate of the political party Martelly had founded, the center-right Haitian Tèt Kale Party (PHTK). In his campaign, Moïse promoted bio-ecological agriculture as an economic engine for Haiti, whose population was over 50% rural. He also expressed support for policies pursued by Martelly: universal education and health care, energy reform, rule of law, the creation of sustainable jobs, environmental protection, and the development of Haiti as a destination for ecotourism and agritourism.

Moïse received 32.8% of votes in the first round of the elections held on 15 October 2015, with 54 candidates competing, qualifying for a runoff with the second-place finisher, Jude Célestin. However, an exit poll conducted by the Haiti Sentinel reflected Moïse receiving only 6% of the vote, and Célestin called the results fraudulent. Thousands of people took to the streets in violent protests, forcing the postponement of the runoff election. In their wake, the ballot was ultimately annulled in June 2016. In February 2016, after incumbent President Michel Martelly stepped down at the end of his term, special elections were held by parliament, and Jocelerme Privert was then installed as interim President until new elections could be held.

On 20 November 2016, a new election was held; a week later, election officials declared, based on preliminary results, that Moïse had won the election with 55.67% of the vote and with an estimated voter turnout of 21%, beating out 26 other candidates — four of whom claimed victory, before the official results were announced. Moïse secured the presidency without having to compete in a second-round election. In second, third, and fourth place were mechanical engineer Jude Celestin of LAPEH with 19.52%, leftist senator Jean-Charles Moïse of the Platfòm Pitit Dessalines (PPD) with 11.04 percent, and Maryse Narcisse of Fanmi Lavalas (FL) with 8.99 percent. Jovenel Moïse was sworn in on 7 February 2017 for a five-year term.

Moïse faced challenges to his mandate, from opposition leaders who believed that Moïse's five-year mandate should end from the date of the inconclusive 2015 elections — that is, on 7 February 2021, five years to the day since his predecessor in office stepped down, though Moïse, counting from the date of his swearing in, had claimed that his term would not end till 2022.

In November 2019, Moïse met at the Haiti National Palace with U.S. Ambassador to the United Nations, Kelly Craft, about ways to implement a consensual resolution of Haiti's political crisis through inclusive dialogue. Craft later met with several political leaders from other parties, listened to their different views, and urged an inclusive solution with Moïse. She also urged the Haitian government to fight corruption, investigate and prosecute human rights abusers, and combat narcotics and human trafficking.

Presidency

Agricultural 
President Moïse built the second-largest hydropower plant and agricultural water reservoir in Haiti after Peligue. He built the "Barrage Marion" in Marion, Haiti, which has the ability to produce electricity and water the farmers land in the North of Haiti. He rebuilt another water reservoir "barrage la Tannerie" to make more water available for farmers to increase agricultural production in that area. He built several water pumping stations using solar power for the same purpose. President Moise was in the process of building a deviation of water from the Dajabón River when he was assassinated.

President Moïse did a lot of work in the Artibonite department, where he leveraged the ministry of public work to curate the water channel system to make it easier for the farmers to grow rice.

Infrastructure 
President Moïse built numerous roads in towns like Jeremie, Port-de-Paix, roads that include Carrefour Joffre/Anse-à-Foleur, Carrefour Trois-Rivières. He rebuilt an upgraded airport in Jérémie. He built power plants to provide electricity to many small towns like Jérémie and Port-de-Paix.

President Moïse built several asphalt plants in several provinces in Haiti, including in Gros Mornes, Les Cayes, and Trou-du-Nord. He repaved roads in Les Cayes and rebuilt the town after it had suffered significant damage from Hurricane Matthew.

Controversies 
President Moïse has had several allegations of corruption, including alleged corruption in road building projects and a contract to sell goats to the Haitian government. These allegations and declining quality of life for Haitian citizens over the course of his administration led to mass protests demanding his resignation.

Electoral history 
Presidential elections were held in Haiti on 25 October 2015, alongside local elections and the second round of the legislative elections.

2015 presidential election 

As no candidate received more than 50% of the vote, a second round was mandated by law. However, this was repeatedly postponed, and eventually cancelled, with an interim president appointed indirectly by the legislature in the February 2016 Haitian presidential election and fresh elections scheduled for 2016.

November 2016 presidential election 

With more than 50% of votes cast, Moïse was elected in the first round.

Assassination 

On 7 July 2021, Moïse was assassinated when gunmen attacked his residence in Pèlerin 5, a district of Pétion-Ville around 1 a.m. Martine Moïse, the first lady of Haiti, was airlifted to Jackson Memorial Hospital in Miami to be treated for wounds she sustained during the attack and continues to recuperate at an undisclosed location in Florida.  Thankfully, none of the couple's children appeared to be home during the attack. A press release issued later that day from the office of acting Prime Minister Claude Joseph blamed the attack on "a group of unidentified individuals, some of whom spoke in Spanish."

In December 2021, The New York Times reported that Moïse's assassination might be linked to Moïse's efforts to curb narcotics trafficking and plans to publicly expose high-ranking Haitian officials involved in the Haitian drug trade.

Ariel Henry, who had been selected as the Prime Minister by Moïse shortly before his death, was later accused by several officials of being connected to Joseph Felix Badio, an alleged mastermind of the assassination, and being involved in the planning. One of the alleged masterminds Rodolphe Jaar also stated that Henry was close to Badio and had protected him after the assassination. Judge Garry Orélien, who was previously the top judicial official in Haiti overseeing the case, stated that Henry was friends with Badio and planned the assassination with him.

Legacy
Public opinion and scholarly assessment of Moïse's tenure were mixed and divided.
Widely perceived as uncompromising and headstrong, Moïse was criticized for his vehement intolerance of dissent and political opposition, and for his attempts to consolidate and remain in power. He also received praise for his robust efforts to rein in corruption and his courage in being willing to stand up against oligarchs and the Haitian elite.

Honors 
Moïse was awarded the Order of Brilliant Jade with Grand Cordon by the president of Taiwan, Tsai Ing-wen, in May 2018. Tsai commended the economic initiatives undertaken by Moïse's government.

See also 
 List of assassinated and executed heads of state and government
 Vilbrun Guillaume Sam, Haitian president assassinated in 1915

References 

1968 births
2021 deaths
2010s in Haiti
21st-century Haitian politicians
Assassinated Haitian politicians
Assassinated heads of state
Candidates for President of Haiti
Deaths by firearm in Haiti
Haitian businesspeople
Haitian politicians
Haitian Tèt Kale Party politicians
Male murder victims
People from Nord-Est (department)
People murdered in Haiti
Presidents of Haiti
Quisqueya University alumni